Eleven Eleven Twelve Foundation (EET) is a Nigerian non-profit organisation on the sustainability of the environment through public advocacy and empowerment/support for entrepreneurs and small businesses who have innovative, creative and sustainable ideas in line with the United Nations Sustainable Development Goals.

Eleven Eleven Twelve Foundation was founded in 2019 in Ibadan by Adetunji Lam-Adesina to improve the overall quality of the environment in supporting enterprise development in the Environmental and Agricultural sector in Africa in line with the United Nations Sustainable Development Goals.

References

External links 
 

Environmental organizations based in Nigeria
Nature conservation organizations based in Africa
Anti-nuclear organizations
Environmental organizations based in Africa